Lora Neeyevide is a 1971 Indian Malayalam film, directed by T. R. Raghunath and produced by M. Kunchacko. The film stars Prem Nazir, Ushakumari, K. P. Ummer, KPAC Lalitha, Radhika and Adoor Pankajam in the lead roles. The film had musical score by M. S. Baburaj.

Cast

Prem Nazir as Bernard
Ushakumari as Lora
K. P. Ummer as Somappan
Kottayam Chellappan as Dr Kurian Thomas
Alummoodan as Jeofry
KPAC Lalitha as Meenu
Radhika as Theresa Williams
S. P. Pillai as Ponnappan
Adoor Pankajam as Kuttyamma
Bhargavan as Anto
Vijaya Kumari as Rebecca
K. S. Gopinath as Dr. Paul
Jismol as Nazeema
Joseph Chacko as Lazer
Kottayam Narayanan
Natarajan
Rajamma
S. J. Dev as Father D'Souza

Soundtrack
The music was composed by M. S. Baburaj and the lyrics were written by Vayalar Ramavarma.

References

External links
 

1971 films
1970s Malayalam-language films
Films directed by T. R. Raghunath